Pyrolobus fumarii (literally the "firelobe of the chimney") is a species of archaea known for its ability to live at extremely high temperatures that kill most organisms. It was first discovered in 1997 in a black smoker hydrothermal vent at the Mid-Atlantic Ridge, setting the upper temperature threshold for known life to exist at 113 °C (235.4 °F), but more recently Methanopyrus kandleri has been discovered which can survive temperatures up to 122 °C. (251.6 °F)   The species "freezes" or solidifies and ceases growth at temperatures of 90 °C (194 °F) and below. Strain 121, a microbe from the same family found at a vent in the Pacific Ocean, survived and multiplied during a 10-hour interval spent at 121 °C (249.8 °F) in an autoclave.

References

Further reading

External links
Type strain of Pyrolobus fumarii at BacDive -  the Bacterial Diversity Metadatabase

:fr:Pyrolobus fumarii

Thermoproteota
Archaea described in 1997